"Crazy Love" is a song by American musician CeCe Peniston, released on her debut album, Finally on A&M Records. The title was first issued in the UK as the fourth single from the album, peaking at number forty-four, while in the US (released as her fifth solo single), it reached number thirty-one on the R&B chart in February 1993 after its peak at number ninety-seven on the Billboard Hot 100.

Critical reception
Craig Lytle from AllMusic described the song as "a midtempo number with an alluring chorus melody enhanced by a brisk string arrangement." Larry Flick from Billboard wrote, "Here's yet another gem from CeCe's sparkling, unstoppable debut album, "Finally". A sultry, swing beat is first refashioned with raw hip-hop beats, then transformed into a spirited house romp. All the while, CeCe belts with an assurance reminiscent of Teena Marie." He added that the right edit "could reignite pop and urban radio fires." Randy Clark from Cashbox said it's "a sexy, easy groovin', mid-tempo dance track with almost as many lives as a cat".

Credits and personnel
 Management
 Executive producers – Manny Lehman, Mark Mazzetti
 Recording studios – Prime Cuts & Axis Studios; Right Track Studios and Bass Hit Recording (mix); all New York City, New York
 Publishing – George You've Got It Music, O'Hara Music, MCA (BMI), IDG (ASCAP)

 Production
 Writers – George Lyter, Michael Judson O'Hara, Denise Eisenberg Rich
 Producer, mixing and remixing – Daniel Abraham
 Remix reconstruction – Luis Vega  and Kenny Gonzalez  
 Engineering – Rick Van Benschoten, Lolly Grodner (assistant), David Darlington (remix)

 Personnel
 Lead vocals – Cecilia Peniston
 Keyboards – Peter Schwartz, Terrance Burrus, Joseph E. Moskowitz
 Programming and additional keyboards –  Frederick Quayle  and Joseph Hornof
 Cover art – Simon Fowler
 Design – Simon Carrington

Track listings and formats

 7", US, #AM 0060/580060-7
 "Crazy Love" (LP Edit) - 4:13
 "Crazy Love" (A.R. Mix 7") - 3:51

 CS, US, #31458 8017 4
 "Crazy Love" (LP Edit) - 4:13
 "Crazy Love" (Hard Radio Mix) - 4:01

 12", EU & UK, #AMY 0060/580 060-1
 12", UK, Promo, #AMYDJ 0060
 12", UK, Promo, #AMY 060 DJ
 "Crazy Love" (A.R. Mix 12") - 5:39
 "Crazy Love" (Kenlou 12") - 7:42
 "Crazy Love" (LP Edit) - 4:13
 "Crazy Love" (M.A.W. House Dub) - 7:23
 "Crazy Love" (M.A.W. Dub) - 4:52

 MCD, EU & UK, #AMCD 0060/580060-2
 "Crazy Love" (LP Edit) - 4:13
 "Crazy Love" (LP Version) - 4:49
 "Crazy Love" (A.R. Mix 7") - 3:51
 "Crazy Love" (A.R. Mix 12") - 5:39
 "Crazy Love" (Kenlou 12") - 7:42
 "Crazy Love" (M.A.W. House Dub) - 7:23

 MCD, US, Promo, #31458 8017 2
 "Crazy Love" (LP Edit) - 4:13
 "Crazy Love" (Radio Remix) - 4:09
 "Crazy Love" (Hard Radio Mix) - 4:01
 "Crazy Love" (B. Boy Edit) - 4:32
 "Crazy Love" (LP Version) - 4:48
 "Crazy Love" (12" Remix) - 7:21

 12", US, #31458 0034 1
 "Crazy Love" (12" Remix) - 7:21
 "Crazy Love" (Dub Version) - 5:27
 "Crazy Love" (LP Edit) - 4:13
 "Crazy Love" (B. Boy Mix) - 5:27
 "Crazy Love" (Krazy Dub) - 7:28
 "Crazy Love" (Hard Radio Mix) - 4:01

 12", US, Double, Promo, #31458 8017 1
 "Crazy Love" (12" Remix) - 7:21
 "Crazy Love" (Dub Version) - 5:27
 "Crazy Love" (LP Version) - 4:48
 "Crazy Love" (B. Boy Mix) - 5:27
 "Crazy Love" (5 OH Beats) - 2:36
 "Crazy Love" (Hard Radio Mix) - 4:01
 "Crazy Love" (Kenlou 12") - 7:42
 "Crazy Love" (M.A.W. House Dub) - 7:23
 "Crazy Love" (M.A.W. Dub) - 4:52
 "Crazy Love" (Krazy Dub) - 7:28
 "Crazy Love" (Bass Dub) - 4:23

 VA
MAWHouse Masters (4xCD)UK, #HOMAS21CD  35. "Crazy Love" (Krazy Dub) - 7:28

Charts

References

General

 Specific

External links 
 

1992 singles
CeCe Peniston songs
Songs written by Denise Eisenberg Rich
1991 songs
A&M Records singles